The term Socratic paradox may be used to refer to several seemingly paradoxical claims made by the philosopher Socrates:

I know that I know nothing, a saying which is sometimes (somewhat inaccurately) attributed to Socrates
Socratic intellectualism, the view that nobody ever knowingly does wrong
Socratic fallacy, the view that using a word meaningfully requires being able to give an explicit definition of it